Kanijeli Siyavuş Pasha (died 1602, Istanbul) was an Ottoman statesman from the Sanjak of Bosnia. He was Grand Vizier between 24 December 1582 and 28 July 1584, 15 April 1586 and 2 April 1589, and 4 April 1592 and 28 January 1593. He was from Kanizsa in modern-day Hungary, then part of first the Sanjak and then the Eyalet of Bosnia.

Marriage and issue
In 1573 he married Fatma Sultan, the youngest daughter of Sultan Selim II and Nurbanu Sultan.

They had four sons and a daughter:
Sultanzade Ahmed Bey (1573 - 1582/1583)
Sultanzade Mustafa Paşah (1575 - April 1599)
Sultanzade Abdülkaadir Bey (1577 - 1583)
Sultanzade Süleyman Bey (1579 - 1583)
Fülane Hanımsultan (October 1580 - October 1580). Stillbirth. Fatma died in childbirth.

See also
 List of Ottoman Grand Viziers

References 

16th-century Grand Viziers of the Ottoman Empire
Governors of the Ottoman Empire
Bosnian Muslims from the Ottoman Empire
Devshirme
Converts to Islam
Year of birth unknown
1602 deaths
People from the Ottoman Empire of Croatian descent
Croatian former Christians